Jack of Clubs Creek is a creek located in the Cariboo region of British Columbia. This creek was discovered in 1861. It was mined and yielded about $450,000 in gold during the early years. A survey in 1987 found the tailings deposited in the valley were leaching heavy metals into the water, and that the concentrations of mercury in fish caught in the area were at the upper limit of safety for human consumption.

Hydrology
The creek feeds the Jack of Clubs Lake, and the outflow of the lake drains into the Willow River at Wells. Average flow at the mouth is 0.99m3/s.

References

Rivers of British Columbia
Cariboo Land District